Drought Season is a collaboration album between American rappers Berner & The Jacka, the first album of their Drought Season series. The album features guest appearances from Michael Marshall, B-Legit and San Quinn, among other artists.

Drought Season peaked at #55 on the R&B/Hip-Hop Albums chart and at #25 on the Rap Albums chart, making it Berner's first charting album and one of his most successful to date.

A music video has been filmed for "Purp" featuring B-Legit & Cozmo.

Track listing

References

2008 albums
Collaborative albums
The Jacka albums